The following is a list of people executed by the U.S. state of Nebraska since its statehood.


Before 1903

The first execution in Nebraska reportedly belonged to Cyrus Tator, a former Kansas Legislature member and judge in Lykins County, Kansas who was tried and convicted of murdering his business partner in 1863. Before 1903, counties carried out executions until the state took over. Since Nebraska statehood in 1867, a total of 14 people have been executed.

1903–1972
A total of 20 people were executed by Nebraska after 1897 and before the 1972 Supreme Court capital punishment ban.

After 1976
Four people convicted of murder have been executed by Nebraska since 1976. Three were executed by electrocution. On April 21, 2011, the Nebraska Supreme Court set the first execution date via lethal injection for June 14, 2011. On May 26, 2011, the Nebraska Supreme Court stayed the execution due to objections that the sodium thiopental that Nebraska purchased from a Mumbai company failed to comply with U.S. pharmaceutical standards. The state's first lethal injection was carried out on August 14, 2018.

See also 
Capital punishment in Nebraska
Capital punishment in the United States

External links 
Nebraska executions

References 

People executed by Nebraska
Nebraska
Executed
Executions